Cristiano Lupatelli (born 21 June 1978) is an Italian professional football coach and former player who is the goalkeeping coach of club Juventus U23. As a player, he was a goalkeeper; he is known for his trademark goatee and sideburns with his bald head.

Club career
Lupatelli was born in Perugia. He won a scudetto while playing for A.S. Roma in season 2000–01. A Roma youth product, Lupatelli was farmed to Chievo for the 2001–02 and 2002–03 seasons, after he played just 12 Serie A games for the capital club, wearing the number 10 jersey, despite being a goalkeeper, because of a bet he made with friends. He was sold to Chievo for 3 billion Italian lire in a co-ownership deal in 2002. In the 2003–04 season, he returned to Roma for €900,000, as the backup of Ivan Pelizzoli.

In summer 2004, he joined Fiorentina on a free transfer.

Lupatelli featured regularly for the Fiorentina first team in the 2004–05 season, but after the arrival of Sébastien Frey in 2005, Bogdan Lobonţ in the 2006–07 season, and Vlada Avramov in 2007, he became the club's third choice keeper, and was loaned out to Parma during 2005–06 season for part of Frey's deal.

Whilst on loan at Parma F.C., he was exchanged with Matteo Guardalben mid-season.

In September 2008, he joined Cagliari on a free transfer, acting as a deputy to Federico Marchetti.

He was set to become a free agent on 1 July 2010, and was not called up to the club's 2010–11 pre-season training camp.
During the 2010–11 summer transfer window, he joined Bologna on a free transfer, as Emiliano Viviano's backup.

On 8 July 2011, he joined Genoa on a free transfer, after being released from Bologna. He served as the backup to Frey once again.

On 15 July 2012, he joined Fiorentina once again, on a free transfer.

He retired from football after his contract with Fiorentina expired on 1 July 2015.

Managerial career 
On 15 August 2018, Lupatelli was appointed goalkeeping coach of newly-formed Serie C club Juventus U23, the reserve team of Juventus.

References

External links
 Lupatelli's profile (from Cagliari official website)

Living people
1978 births
Sportspeople from Perugia
Footballers from Umbria
Italian footballers
Association football goalkeepers
Italy under-21 international footballers
S.S. Fidelis Andria 1928 players
A.S. Roma players
A.C. ChievoVerona players
ACF Fiorentina players
Parma Calcio 1913 players
Palermo F.C. players
Cagliari Calcio players
Bologna F.C. 1909 players
Genoa C.F.C. players
Serie A players
Serie B players
Association football goalkeeping coaches